John Marion Galloway House is a historic home located at Greensboro, Guilford County, North Carolina. It was designed by noted architect Harry Barton and built in 1919. It is a three-story, rectangular dwelling with Tudor Revival and Bungalow / American Craftsman style design elements.  It has a veneer of random-coursed granite with half-timbered gable ends, gable-roofed dormers, and a red tile roof.  Also on the property is a contributing two-story double garage which once included servants' quarters.

It was listed on the National Register of Historic Places in 1983.  It is located in the Fisher Park Historic District.  The house was built for John Marion Galloway (1880-1922) who was reportedly the largest grower of bright leaf tobacco in the world.

References

Houses on the National Register of Historic Places in North Carolina
Tudor Revival architecture in North Carolina
Houses completed in 1919
Houses in Greensboro, North Carolina
National Register of Historic Places in Guilford County, North Carolina
Historic district contributing properties in North Carolina